Kitson is a surname first found in Yorkshire. Notable people with the surname include:

 Albert Ernest Kitson (1868–1937), British-Australian geologist and naturalist
 Albert Kitson (1863–1944), British peer
 Alec Kitson (1921–1997), British trade unionist
 Alison Kitson, British health scientist and nursing leader
 Arthur Kitson (1859–1937), British monetary theorist and inventor
 Arthur Octavius Kitson (1848–1915), British biographer of Captain James Cook
 Barry Kitson, British comics artist
 Charles Herbert Kitson (1874–1944), English organist, teacher and music educator
 Daniel Kitson (born 1977), British comedian
 Dave Kitson (born 1980), English former footballer
 David Kitson (1925–2002), English cricketer
 Frank Kitson (born 1926), retired British Army officer and writer on military subjects
 Harold Kitson (1874–1951), South African tennis player
 Henry Kitson (1877–1952), Royal Navy officer
 Henry Hudson Kitson (died 1947), English-American sculptor
 James Kitson (1835–1911), British politician
Jessie Beatrice Kitson (1876-1965), Lord Mayor of Leeds
 Jill Kitson (1939–2013), Australian radio broadcaster and literary journalist
 Joey Kitson (born 1969), Canadian musician and lead singer of the band Rawlins Cross
 John Kitson (1818–1907), English cricketer
 John William Kitson (1846–1888), English architectural sculptor
 Ken Kitson (born 1946), British actor
 Norma Kitson (1933–2002), South African political activist
 Oliver Kitson (1915–1996), British peer
 Paul Kitson (born 1971), English former footballer
 Peter Kitson (born 1958), British academic and author
 Robert Hawthorn Kitson (1873–1947), British painter
 Roland Kitson (1882–1958), British businessman
 Simon Kitson (born c. 1967), British historian
 Suzie Kitson (born 1969), former woman test cricketer
 Syd Kitson (born 1958), American football guard
 Theo Alice Ruggles Kitson (1871–1932), American sculptor
 Thomas Kitson (1485–1540), English merchant
 Timothy Kitson (1931–2019), British politician

English-language surnames
Patronymic surnames
Surnames from given names